The South Austin Moonlighters is an American Americana band from Austin, Texas.  Their album, Travel Light, charted at #1 on the Alternative-Country charts in 2019 with single, Machine Gun Kelly charting at #11 on the Top Alternative Country Song Chart for the Year of 2019. They have performed at SXSW      
 and The Dallas International Guitar Music Festival and have shared the stage with Gin Blossoms,  Cory Morrow, Eric Gales, Sonny Landreth, and others.

Music career
In 2011, The South Austin Moonlighters was founded by singer/songwriter/bass player Lonnie Trevino Jr. (Fastball, Monte Montgomery, and Mike Zito) in Austin, Texas. The original band members began performing a weekday residency at the Saxon Pub in Austin as a "moonlighting" band as they were all in playing in different bands at the time.  Soon afterward they became an established band.

Travel Light, released in 2019, charted at #1 on the Alternative-Country charts. On the Top Alternative Country Song Chart for the Year of 2019, singles Machine Gun Kelly charted at #11, Feels Like Home #24, and Nowhere Left to Run #25. Travel Light's music video was premiered in an article on Cowboys & Indians.

The band has performed live on numerous video streaming radio stations including Texas Red Dirt Roads Radio and Austin City Limits Radio.

 Discography
 2019 - Travel Light
In 2019 the band released, Travel Light, produced by Anders Osborne.
Osbourne suggested that the band record the album at a destination recording studio as they wouldn't have any outside distractions.  In an interview with Ditty TV, Trevino Jr. said, We are always most proud of the last piece of art you accomplish, right? That being said, I really do believe this album is more focused than any other album we’ve produced in the past. Our producer, Anders Osborne, made sure of that. In the past, we would record a record with many genres, moods, and/or vibes in mind; just like the bands and records we grew up with. We all write and sing, so in past albums we were all over the map, like say The Beatles’ "White Album" or The Kinks’ "The Kinks Are the Village Green Preservation Society".
 2016 - Ghost of a Small Town
Ghost of a Small Town was recorded at Chris Beall’s (lead guitar/lead vocals) at-home studio, and was self-produced by the band. "Initially we were thinking of just using my studio a few times to get some ideas down, but it all started sounding really good so we just kept coming back and putting down more songs" said Chris Beall. The album was released on Waterloo Records, garnering radio airplay and a European distribution deal.
 2014 - Burn & Shine
Burn & Shine was the band's debut album, recorded in 2013.  During SXSW 2012, record labels from Europe were interested in seeing The South Austin Moonlighters perform which resulted in the band signing with German record label, Blue Rose Records, releasing Burn & Shine in 2014 in Europe and Scadinavia.
 "Outstanding, effortlessly organic music that oozes with joy, soul and groove", said The Austin Observer.
 2012 - Live at the Saxon Pub

References

Musical groups from Austin, Texas
Americana music
Musical groups established in 2011